The men's banked slalom competition of the 2018 Winter Paralympics was held at Jeongseon Alpine Centre, South Korea. The competition took place on 16 March 2018.

Medal table
The ranking in the table is based on information provided by the International Paralympic Committee (IPC) and will be consistent with IPC convention in its published medal tables. By default, the table will be ordered by the number of gold medals the athletes from a nation have won (in this context, a "nation" is an entity represented by a National Paralympic Committee). The number of silver medals is taken into consideration next and then the number of bronze medals. If nations are still tied, equal ranking is given and they are listed alphabetically by IPC country code.

Banked slalom SB-LL1
The following 13 athletes from 10 countries competed.

Banked slalom SB-LL2
The following 20 athletes from 13 countries competed.

Banked slalom SB-UL
The following 22 athletes from 13 countries competed.

See also
 Snowboarding at the 2018 Winter Paralympics
 Snowboarding at the 2018 Winter Olympics

References

Men's banked slalom